Hamdi Dahmani (born 16 November 1987) is a German-Tunisian footballer who plays as forward or midfielder.

Career
In his youth, Dahmani played for Alemannia Aachen and Bayer Leverkusen. After stints with GFC Düren 09 and Sportfreunde Troisdorf 05, he joined Fortuna Köln in the summer of 2008. With them he played in the fourth tier of German football, the Regionalliga West, for four seasons. From July to September 2012 he had no club. Then he joined city and league rivals Viktoria Köln. After only one season, he parted ways once again. Again he became a free agent, before returning to his former club in January 2014. Fortuna now played in the 3. Liga after promotion from the Regionlliga the previous season. He made his 3. Liga debut on 27 July 2014, the first matchday of the season against Sonnenhof Großaspach, playing the full 90 minutes in the 2–1 defeat.

On 25 June 2019, Dahmani joined Rot-Weiss Essen on a two-year contract.

References

External links
 
 

Living people
1987 births
Footballers from Cologne
Association football midfielders
German footballers
German people of Tunisian descent
Tunisian footballers
SC Fortuna Köln players
FC Viktoria Köln players
Rot-Weiss Essen players
Alemannia Aachen players
3. Liga players
Regionalliga players